An auspex, or augur, was an interpreter of omens in ancient Rome.

Auspex may also refer to:
 Auspex International, a London-based data analytics company
 Auspex Pharmaceuticals, an American pharmaceutical company acquired by Teva
 Auspex Systems, a defunct American computer storage company

Persons with the name
 Pollienus Auspex (consul under Commodus) (fl. 3rd century), Roman military officer, senator, and suffect consul
 Pollienus Auspex (consul under Marcus Aurelius) (fl. late 2nd century and early 3rd century),  Roman military officer, senator, and suffect consul
 Tiberius Julius Pollienus Auspex (fl. 3rd century), Roman senator and suffect consul

See also
 Haruspex